The Cameroon Fed Cup team represents Cameroon in Fed Cup tennis competition and are governed by the Fédération Camerounaise de Tennis. They have not competed since 2017.

History
Cameroon competed in its first Fed Cup in 1997.  They have won one of their ties to date.

Players

See also
Fed Cup
Cameroon Davis Cup team

External links

Billie Jean King Cup teams
Fed Cup
Fed Cup